The 4th Seiyu Awards ceremony was held on March 6, 2010 at UDX Theater in Akihabara, Tokyo. It was followed up by a Special Stage Event with the winners on March 28.  The period of general voting lasted from Oct 1, 2009 to Jan 1, 2010.

References

Seiyu Awards ceremonies
Seiyu
Seiyu
2010 in Japanese cinema
2010 in Japanese television